Visage is an album by American jazz saxophonist Rob Brown recorded in 1998 and released on the French Marge label. It features a never previously heard Rob Brown trio with bassist Wilber Morris and drummer Lou Grassi. These three musicians were programmed with different bands during the 1998 edition of the French Rive de Gier jazz festival and producer Gérard Terronès took the opportunity to record the trio in Paris.

Reception

In his review for AllMusic, Thom Jurek states "The entire album is a meditation on the instinct of blues and mood, and as such it presents Brown in an entirely different light as a soloist and as a leader."

Track listing
All compositions by Rob Brown, Wilber Morris, Lou Grassi
 "A Step Out the Door" – 8:35
 "Vigil" – 8:30 
 "Pivot-full Swing" – 6:52
 "Pussy Foot" – 9:50
 "Bated Breath" – 9:53
 "Skipper" – 15:34 
 "Tatters" – 10:18

Personnel
Rob Brown – alto sax, flute
Wilber Morris – bass
Lou Grassi – drums, percussion

References

2000 albums
Rob Brown (saxophonist) albums
Marge Records albums